Ivona Horvat (born 13 February 1973) is a former Croatian tennis player that played for Yugoslavia and Croatia.

ITF Circuit finals

Singles (4–2)

Doubles (6–7)

External links
 
 

1973 births
Living people
Yugoslav female tennis players
Croatian female tennis players